8,9-Dehydroestrone, or Δ8-estrone, also known as estra-1,3,5(10),8-tetraen-3-ol-17-one, is a naturally occurring estrogen found in horses which is closely related to equilin, equilenin, and estrone, and, as the 3-sulfate ester sodium salt, is a minor constituent (3.5%) of conjugated estrogens (Premarin). It produces 8,9-dehydro-17β-estradiol as an important active metabolite, analogously to conversion of estrone or estrone sulfate into estradiol. The compound was first described in 1997. In addition to 8,9-dehydroestrone and 8,9-dehydro-17β-estradiol, 8,9-dehydro-17α-estradiol is likely also to be present in conjugated estrogens, but has not been identified at this time.

See also
 List of estrogens § Equine estrogens

References

Phenols
Estranes
Estrogens
Ketones